Curicaca (in hispanicized spelling) or Quri Qaqa (Quechua quri gold, qaqa rock, "gold rock") is one of thirty-four districts of the Jauja Province in the Junín Region of Peru.

See also 
 Waqraqucha

References